James Robinson (born March 4, 1994) is an American professional basketball player who last played for Igokea of the Adriatic League. He played college basketball for the University of Pittsburgh before playing professionally in Bosnia, Germany and Israel.

Early life and college career
Robinson attended DeMatha Catholic High School in Hyattsville, Maryland, where he won more games (120) than any player in the school's history and lost only one home game. As a senior, Robinson was named First Team All-MET by the Washington Post after averaging 11.2 points, 8.0 rebounds and 6.4 assists per game. He also led DeMatha to a 30-6 overall record, 15-3 WCAC record, No. 1 state ranking and No. 11 national ranking by USA Today.

Robinson played college basketball for the University of Pittsburgh's Panthers, where he averaged 10.2 points, 3.1 rebounds, 5 assists and 1.1 steals per game in his senior year. He finished his college career as the ACC leader in career assist-to-turnover ratio (3.56:1) and among the Pittsburgh all-time leaders in assists (10th - 438) and free throw percentage (fifth - .808).

Professional career

Igokea (2016–2017)
On August 8, 2016, Robinson started his professional career with the Bosnian team Igokea, signing a one-year deal. Robinson helped Igokea to win the 2017 Bosnian Cup. On May 21, 2017, Robinson recorded 17 points, 4 rebounds and 7 assists in Game 5, leading Igokea to win the 2017 Bosnian League Championship after a 96–72 win over Bosna Royal. In 39 games played for Igokea, he averaged 13.9 points, 3.7 rebounds and 3.7 assists per game.

Medi Bayreuth (2017–2018)
On June 30, 2017, Robinson signed with the German team Medi Bayreuth for the 2017–18 season. On November 5, 2017, Robinson recorded a season-high 23 points, shooting 8-of-15 from the field, along with 5 rebounds, 5 assists and 2 steals in a 103–99 win over Eisbären Bremerhaven.

Robinson helped Medi Bayreuth reach the 2018 Champions League Quarterfinals, where they eventually lost to Riesen Ludwigsburg. In 58 games played during the 2017–18 season, he averaged 9.7 points, 2.3 rebounds and 3.4 assists per game.

Bnei Herzliya (2018–2019)
On July 13, 2018, Robinson signed a two-year deal with the Israeli team Bnei Herzliya. On March 25, 2019, Robinson recorded a season-high 23 points, shooting 4-of-7 from three-point range, along with five rebounds in a 95–81 win over Hapoel Gilboa Galil. On April 1, 2019, Robinson suffered a season-ending injury in a match against Ironi Nes Ziona.

Return to Medi Bayreuth (2019–2020)
On June 21, 2019, Robinson returned to Medi Bayreuth for a second stint, signing a one-year deal. He averaged 10.3 points and 4.5 assists per game in Bundesliga.

Löwen Braunschweig (2020–2021)
On August 14, 2020, Robinson signed with Basketball Löwen Braunschweig. He averaged 10.9 points, 4.9 assists, and 2.5 rebounds per game.

Igokea (2021–2022)
On August 10, 2021, Robinson signed with Igokea of the Adriatic League.

National team career
In September 2012, Robinson helped the United States under-18 national team win the 2012 FIBA Americas Under-18 Championship, earning a gold medal. He averaged 4.4 points in 15.6 minutes per game.

In July 2013, Robinson helped the United States under-19 national team win the 2013 FIBA U19 World Championships, earning a gold medal.

References

External links
 Pittsburgh Panthers bio
 RealGM.com profile
 ESPN.com profile
 Eurobasket.com profile
 ABA Liga profile

1994 births
Living people
ABA League players
American expatriate basketball people in Bosnia and Herzegovina
American expatriate basketball people in Germany
American expatriate basketball people in Israel
American men's basketball players
Basketball players from Maryland
Bnei Hertzeliya basketball players
DeMatha Catholic High School alumni
KK Igokea players
Medi Bayreuth players
Pittsburgh Panthers men's basketball players
People from Mitchellville, Maryland
Point guards
Shooting guards
Sportspeople from the Washington metropolitan area